"When Love Comes Callin'" is a song written by Mark Miller and Randy Scruggs, and recorded by American country music group Sawyer Brown.  It was released in October 1990 as the first single from their Greatest Hits compilation album.  The song reached #40 on the Billboard Hot Country Singles & Tracks chart.

Chart performance

References

1990 singles
Sawyer Brown songs
Songs written by Mark Miller (musician)
Songs written by Randy Scruggs
Capitol Records Nashville singles
Curb Records singles
1990 songs